The International Racquetball Federation's 19th Racquetball World Championships were held in San José, Costa Rica from August 10 to 18. This was the first time Worlds had been in Costa Rica, and the first time a Central American country hosted the event.

In 2016, Mexican Paola Longoria won her third World Championship in women's singles, which tied her with Cheryl Gudinas and Michelle Gould for most World Championships in women's singles. Gabriela Martinez of Guatemala was Longoria's opponent in the final, and she was a surprise finalist, as she was only 16 years old, although she was the World Junior Champion in girl's U16. Also, neither American player - Michelle Key or Rhonda Rajsich - made the podium, which was the first time an American woman had not finished in the top three in World Championship history.

Tournament format
The 2018 World Championships used a two-stage format with an initial group stage that was a round robin with the results used to seed players for a medal round.

Group stage

Pool A

Pool B

Pool C

Pool D

Pool E

Pool F

Pool G

Medal round

References

Women's singles